Teg147 RNA (also known as sRNA85, SAOUHSCs103) is a non-coding RNA identified by RNA-seq in Staphylococcus aureus N315   with homologues in other Staphylococcus species.

References

External links
 

Non-coding RNA